Thipsamay Chanthaphone (born 24 July 1961) is a Laotian racewalker. He competed in the men's 20 kilometres walk at the 1980 Summer Olympics.

References

External links
 

1961 births
Living people
Athletes (track and field) at the 1980 Summer Olympics
Laotian male racewalkers
Olympic athletes of Laos
Place of birth missing (living people)